The 2023 season will be the Jacksonville Jaguars' upcoming 29th season in the National Football League, their third full season under the leadership of general manager Trent Baalke and their second under head coach Doug Pederson. They will attempt to improve upon their 9–8 record from the previous season.

Draft

Draft trades

Staff

Current roster

Preseason
The Jaguars' preseason opponents and schedule will be announced in the spring.

Regular season

2023 opponents
Listed below are the Jaguars' opponents for 2023. Exact dates and times will be announced in the spring. The Jaguars will also host one of their games at Wembley Stadium in London as part of the NFL International Series.

References

External links
 

Jacksonville
Jacksonville Jaguars seasons
Jacksonville Jaguars